Kitaotao, officially the Municipality of Kitaotao, is a 1st class municipality in the province of Bukidnon, Philippines. According to the 2020 census, it has a population of 53,796 people.

History

Cultural
During the Spanish regime, a Manobo Tribe in Bukidnon, headed by Datu Tayaotao, was known among its neighboring settlements for his bravery and leadership. When the Spaniards invaded Cotabato, in one of their drives to expand their colonial control over the Philippines, Datu Tayaotao was called upon for help by one Datu Muslim. The combined forces of the Muslims and Manobo successfully repulsed the Spanish operation.

A feast was declared by the Muslim chief to honor and thank Datu Tayaotao and his men. During the feast, the Muslim chief offered his only daughter to Datu Tayaotao to be his wife, as reward and bond, to strengthen the relation of the two tribes.

The wedding took place at Datu Tayaotao's enclave, followed by a three-day feast. The Muslim Datu, overwhelmed by the gaiety and lavishness of the celebration, proclaimed and called Datu Tayaotao as Datu Kitaotao, the chief of the land of wealth. After his death, the locality was named after Datu Kitaotao.

Political
Kitaotao was once part of the district of Maramag. The creation of Kibawe in 1956 as a new district reclassified Kitaotao as part of Kibawe. After the Second World War, municipalities were created from the existing district and some settlements. In 1961, President Carlos P. Garcia issued Executive Order No. 444 for the creation of the municipality.

Under the sponsorship of Bukidnon Congressman Benjamin Tabios, House Bill No. 1655 was passed by Congress and approved by President Ferdinand E. Marcos as Republic Act No. 4801 for the creation of Kitaotao into a municipality on June 16, 1966. Its first political election was held in November 1967, electing Eusebio B. Pabualan as Kitaotao's first municipal mayor. At present, Kitaotao is composed of 35 barangays and 108 sitios, with an approximate area of 52, 512 hectares.

Geography
Kitaotao is situated in the southern part of Bukidnon. It lies in the 124°24’ east longitude and 7°40’ to 7°39 south longitude. It is bounded in the north by the municipalities of Don Carlos, Quezon and San Fernando; and the municipalities of Kadingilan, Dangcagan, and Kibawe in the west; and then the province of North Cotabato in the south and Davao City in the east.

Topography
The area along the Sayre Highway is a plateau while the eastern portion including the Upper Pulangi region is mostly rolling hills with varying mountain slopes.

There are several mountains along the North Cotabato-Davao del Norte Border. Foremost of them are Mt. Sinaka, Mt. Malambo, Mt. Molawit, Mt. Makaayat, Mt. Kibinaton, Mt. Mahanao, Mt. Sumalili, Mt. Zita, and Mt. Kibanda which serve as the sanctuaries of the rare Philippine wildlife. It featured also the numerous waterfalls such as Sumalili, Kinanoran, Matigol and Lalapoy Falls which can be found in the Upper Pulangi region.

Drainage is generally directed southwards where the principal rivers: Pulangi, Muleta, Kulaman, Rawari, Zita, and Salog River.

Climate

Barangays
Kitaotao is politically subdivided into 35 barangays.

Demographics

Economy

References

External links

 [ Philippine Standard Geographic Code]
Philippine Census Information

Municipalities of Bukidnon
Populated places on the Rio Grande de Mindanao